Albert Fish (1922 – April 5, 2006) was a Canadian realtor and Member of Parliament.

Born in Preston, England, he served in the Royal Air Force during World War II. In 1949, he emigrated to Canada and lived in Guelph, Ontario. He started working in real estate in 1954 and opened his own firm, Albert Fish Real Estate Limited, in 1957. After serving as President of the Ontario Real Estate Association, he became President of the Canadian Real Estate Association in 1973. In the 1979 federal election, he was elected to the Canadian House of Commons representing the electoral district of Guelph as a Progressive Conservative Party candidate. He was defeated in the 1980 election.

In 1986, he became President of the International Real Estate Federation.

He died in 2006 of complications following a heart attack. Fish had previously suffered a heart attack during the 1980 election campaign.

Electoral record

References

External links

1922 births
2006 deaths
British emigrants to Canada
Progressive Conservative Party of Canada MPs
Members of the House of Commons of Canada from Ontario
Politicians from Preston, Lancashire
People from Guelph